Max Dudler (born 18 November 1949 in Altenrhein, Switzerland) is a Swiss architect with international fame. The main characteristic of Max Dudler's architecture is a combination of strict Swiss minimalism and classical rationalism that is found both in the historical and contemporary architecture.

Education and career
Max Dudler studied at the Frankfurt Städelschule, a contemporary fine arts academy, where he was a student of Günter Bock, and later at the Academy of Arts in Berlin with Ludwig Leo. He obtained his diploma in 1979.

His first employment in 1981 brought him to O. M. Ungers, with whom and others he completed the exhibition hall 9 and the Galleria of Messe Frankfurt. In 1986 he established his own firm with Karl Dudler und Pete Welbergen, but since 1992, he started to run the firm with offices in Berlin, Frankfurt am Main and Zürich without a partner.

Dudler has held many teaching positions and had exhibitions both in Germany and Italy, for example, he was a faculty member at IUAV University of Venice  1989/1990. He was a lecturer at the summer academy of architecture in Herne (1989), Mantua (1990), Naples 1993 to 1995) and Vienna (1996). From 1996 to 1999 he was a Visiting Professor at the University of Dortmund. Since 2004 he has been a Professor for Architecture at the prestigious Art Academy in Düsseldorf together with Axel Schultes and Laurids Ortner (who was a professor there from 1987 to 2009).

Important buildings (selection)
 1986–1989: BEWAG Substation, Berlin
 1997–2004: Federal Ministry of Transport, Building and Urban Development (Building extensions), Berlin
 1999–2000: The building of Deutschen Börse, Frankfurt
 2005: Ritter Museum for Alfred Ritter GmbH & Co. KG, Waldenbuch near Stuttgart
 2002–2005: Dioezesan Library, Münster
 2003–2009: Skyscrapers Ensemble on Elmstreet, Frankfurt
 2006–2009: Jacob-und-Wilhelm-Grimm-Zentrum der Humboldt University of Berlin
 2008–2012: New City Hall on Brother House Terrain, Reutlingen
 2009: Jacob und Wilhelm Grimm-Zentrum library at Humboldt University of Berlin
 2009–2011: Hambach Castle, Neustadt an der Weinstraße
 2011: Visitor Centre, Heidelberg Castle
 2014: Visitor Centre, Sparrenburg Castle, Bielefeld
Museumsinsel (Berlin U-Bahn) station

Publications (selection)
 Max Dudler: Museum Ritter, Niggli Verlag, Sulgen/Zürich 2005, 
 Max Dudler: IBM Schweiz, Niggli Verlag, Sulgen/Zürich 2005, 
 J. Chr. Bürkle: Max Dudler, Architektur für die Stadt, Niggli Verlag, Sulgen/Zürich 2003, 
 Max Dudler, Gerwin Zohlen: Bauplan, die Architektur Max Dudlers, Gebr. Mann Verlag Berlin 2002, 
 Max Dudler, Martin Kieren: Max Dudler, Architekt, Gebr. Mann Verlag Berlin 1999,

Notes and references

External links 

Biography at "Museum Ritter"
 Interview with Max Dudler (German) about - What is architecture?
 
 

1949 births
Living people
Swiss architects
20th-century German architects
Städelschule alumni
Academic staff of Kunstakademie Düsseldorf
21st-century German architects